"Young Johnstone" is Child ballad 88, a border ballad that exists in several variants. The ballad tells the story of a woman killed either by her brother or lover, depending on the variant.

Synopsis 
Several variants open with the heroine's brother and lover drinking together.  One of them proposes that they each marry the other's sister.  One of them kills the other: often, the brother's reason is that the other has refused to marry his sister but intends to keep her as his mistress.

In one variant, the love seeks refuge with his mother and his sister and is turned away.

In all variants, the surviving man seeks refuge with the heroine, confessing to having killed her brother or her love.  She hides him.  When his pursuers are gone, he stabs her.  She remonstrates, and he promises to get her doctors if she lives out the hour, but she tells him the wound will be mortal before then.

See also 
 List of the Child Ballads
 Scottish mythology
 English folklore

References 

Child Ballads
Border ballads
Northumbrian folklore
Anglo-Scottish border
Year of song unknown
Songwriter unknown
Murder ballads